Daugherty's Cave and Breeding Site is a Native American archaeological site in Russell County, Virginia, near Lebanon.  The site includes materials dating from the Early Archaic Period to the time of European contact.  Digs at the site have recovered large numbers of animal bones dating from the Middle Archaic Period.

The site was listed on the National Register of Historic Places in 1978.

See also
National Register of Historic Places listings in Russell County, Virginia

References

Archaeological sites on the National Register of Historic Places in Virginia
Russell County, Virginia
Native American history of Virginia
National Register of Historic Places in Russell County, Virginia